Perdizes ( or , Portuguese for "Partridges") is a district in the subprefecture of Lapa, in São Paulo, Brazil.

Located in the area once home to the Pacaembu Farm, Perdizes was historically considered only a poor rural area. Today, it is one of the most urbanized areas of São Paulo and known for being the home of the Pontifical Catholic University of São Paulo.

Districts of São Paulo